Trichotichnus saluki is a species of beetle from the ground beetle family and subfamily Harpalinae.

Taxonomy 
This species was first described in 2020 by Boris Kataev. Jog Falls in the western Indian state of Karnataka was identified as a typical site. The specific epithet was given in honor of Sergei Saluk, who collected the type material.

References 

Harpalinae
Beetles described in 2020